Tichodroma is an ornithological journal published and distributed by the Slovak Ornithological Society/BirdLife Slovakia in cooperation with the Institute of Forest Ecology of the Slovak Academy of Sciences, Zvolen. The journal is issued once per year and publishes ornithological papers and short news in Slovak, Czech and English language with English or German abstracts. The papers are peer reviewed.

See also
List of ornithology journals

External links
 Journal homepage
 Slovak Ornithological Society/BirdLife Slovakia
 Institute of Forest Ecology of the Slovak Academy of Sciences, Zvolen

Journals and magazines relating to birding and ornithology